WLGC-FM (105.7 MHz) is a radio station broadcasting an oldies format. Licensed to Greenup, Kentucky, United States, the station's studios are located in Ashland, Kentucky, with its transmitter remaining in Greenup. The station  broadcasts to the Huntington-Ashland, WV-KY-OH, Metropolitan Statistical Area. The station is currently owned by Greenup County Broadcasting, Inc..

History
On September 1, 1982, WLGC radio debuted at 105.5 FM, playing "The City of New Orleans" by Arlo Guthrie. The song kicked off not only a new radio station, but also a new format: A Little Bit Country, A Little Bit Rock. This hybrid programming was the brainchild of WLGC Vice-President/General Manager Robert Scheibly, who had commissioned a research project to determine viable formats for the fledgling station. Scheibly left the program director's position at WKEE/WHTN to take on the challenge of creating a new radio station focusing on local community needs.

In addition to the unique music mix, WLGC's early years offered a wide variety of programming tailored specifically to Greenup County, including high school sports and a daily "good news" public service newscast.

In 1985, an AM station was added to the Greenup County Broadcasting family. The new station, transmitting at 1520 AM, initially simulcast the FM's programming, but soon developed into WTCV - The Christian Voice - a full-time gospel station. A few years later, the station became the Tri-State's first sports talk station. At the station's request, the AM station's over the air  license was canceled by the Federal Communications Commission on February 1, 2017 and is currently broadcasting as an online only feed from WLGC's website and smartphone app.

The second stage in WLGC's evolution came in March 1992, when the station increased power from 3,000 to 12,500 watts and moved to 105.7 FM. This growth opened a new and competitive market for the company. The format was changed to country music, concurrent with the power increase, and the station became a Tri-state presence.

In 2002, the WLGC studios were moved from Greenup to Ashland, increasing the station's visibility to advertisers and listeners.

On January 13, 2014, at Midnight EST, the station dropped its country music format in favor of an oldies format and was rebranded as "Kool Hits 105.7", playing top 40 hits of the 1960s, '70s and '80s.

On February 10, 2016, long-time morning show host, Mark Justice, suffered a heart attack and died unexpectedly.  Mark had been with the station since 1984 and had served as morning host since 1985, on The Breakfast Club.  Following Mark's death, general manager Jim Forrest said the long running "Breakfast Club Christmas Spectacular" would be renamed the "Mark Justice Memorial Christmas Spectacular", in his honor.

References

External links
Kool Hits 105.7 Facebook

LGC
Classic hits radio stations in the United States
1982 establishments in Kentucky
Radio stations established in 1982
Greenup County, Kentucky